The 1898 New Hampshire gubernatorial election was held on November 8, 1898. Republican nominee Frank W. Rollins defeated Democratic nominee Charles F. Stone with 54.24% of the vote.

General election

Candidates
Major party candidates
Frank W. Rollins, Republican
Charles F. Stone, Democratic

Other candidates
Augustus G. Stevens, Prohibition
Sumner F. Claflin, Social Democratic
Benjamin T. Whitehouse, Socialist Labor
Gardiner J. Greenleaf, People's

Results

References

1898
New Hampshire
Gubernatorial